"Dance, Dance, Dance" is a song by the American rock band  the Beach Boys from their 1965 album Beach Boys Today!. Written by Brian Wilson, Carl Wilson, and Mike Love, it was first issued as a single in October 1964, backed with "The Warmth of the Sun".  "Dance, Dance, Dance" marked Carl's first recognized writing contribution to a Beach Boys single, his contribution being the song's primary guitar riff and solo.

Composition
"Dance, Dance, Dance" was composed by Brian and Carl Wilson, while the lyrics were written by Brian and Mike Love.  Although many pop songs raise their key at the start of a final chorus, "Dance, Dance, Dance" subverts this convention by modulating in the middle of the verse.

Billboard described the song as having a "tremendous rock -surfin' beat and groovy lyrics," saying that the Beach Boys "have never sounded better."  Cash Box described it as a "sensational hot-rod-surfin' [rocker],... that zips along with money-makin' glee."

Variations
The song was originally released in mono, while a remixed stereo version was released on the compilation Hawthorne, CA. An early version of the song, with different lyrics and arrangement, appears as a bonus track on The Beach Boys Today!/Summer Days (And Summer Nights!!) two-fer CD.

Personnel
Credits from Craig Slowinski.

The Beach Boys
Al Jardine – backing and harmony vocals; rhythm guitar
Mike Love – lead, backing and harmony vocals
Brian Wilson – lead, backing and harmony vocals; bass guitar
Carl Wilson – backing and harmony vocals; lead guitar (twelve-string)
Dennis Wilson –  backing and harmony vocals; drums

Additional musicians
Hal Blaine – sleigh bells, triangle, tambourine, castanets
Glen Campbell – acoustic rhythm/lead guitar
Steve Douglas – tenor saxophone
Carl Fortina – accordion
Jay Migliori – baritone saxophone
Ray Pohlman – 6-string bass guitar

Charts

Cover versions
 Wilson Phillips – featuring Brian Wilson's daughters Carnie and Wendy – recorded the song for their album California.
 Big Time Rush sang a cover of this song on the special "Big Time Beach Party".
 The song was recorded and released by Jan & Dean on their 1982 album, One Summer Night/Live.
 Joanie Bartels covered this song on her 1991 album, Dancin' Magic.

References

External links
 

1964 singles
The Beach Boys songs
Jan and Dean songs
Songs written by Brian Wilson
Songs written by Mike Love
Songs written by Carl Wilson
Song recordings produced by Brian Wilson
Capitol Records singles
1964 songs
Songs about dancing